Resort to Love is a Netflix original movie, written by Tabi McCartney and Dana Schmalenberg. It follows Erica (Christina Milian), an aspiring pop star in the midst of a career standstill, who ends up landing a gig as the entertainment lead at a luxurious island resort where, unbeknownst to her, her ex-fiancé is having his wedding.

Plot
Aspiring pop star Erica Wilson's dreams are crushed when her musical partner and producer bails on his album release party, which would've started her career. Down the street, the devastated Erica is crying in disarray with her best friend, Amber, when a couple of buskers begins to play "No One" by Alicia Keys. This causes Erica to remember when Jason, her ex-fiancé of 4 years, pulled the rug out from under her, breaking up with her right before their wedding. The song makes Erica all the more hysterical as it was supposed to play during the first dance at her wedding. 
Tired of seeing her friend let go of her romantic and professional life, Amber, a social media influencer, books Erica a gig working as an entertainer at an upscale resort in Mauritius. It takes a while for Erica to accept Amber's offering, but after a bit of convincing, she decides to take the job.

There, she's greeted by the resort's jack-of-all-trades, Barrington, who is also in her band. Erica is hopeful the island will be paradise and a nice way to leave all her troubles behind, but she soon has a change of heart after learning that she has been hired as a wedding singer. Her first performance is subpar and she doubts her ability to keep her job. Barrington advises her to sing something that makes her happy, and there is a montage of Erica singing Gloria Gaynor's "I Will Survive", embracing her surroundings, and making the best of her time on the island.
Erica runs into Jason and learns that he's there for his wedding weekend. Shocked, Erica knows she's going to have to sing at their wedding, so she tries to make it a point not to run into him until then. Later, Erica meets Caleb, an ex-Navy SEAL who saves her from drowning. She also learns that Caleb is Jason's estranged brother, there for the wedding.

Erica meets the bride-to-be, Beverly, and the rest of the wedding party. Erica and Jason try to avoid each other as much as possible at the resort, but Erica winds up spending a good chunk of time with them because Beverly thinks Erica is just an old friend, not Jason's ex. Erica spends a majority of her time with Caleb, getting to know each other and connecting on a romantic level. 
The night of Beverly's bachelorette party, she learns of Jason and Erica's past, which cases drama before their big day. However, this is soon resolved after Erica explains herself in a high-speed getaway van Beverly is in. After making up, Beverly and Jason get married, and Erica sings "No One" by Alicia Keys at the reception. At the end of the song, Erica acknowledges her new lover, Caleb, by planting a kiss on him.

Cast

Production 

The film was directed by Steven K. Tsuchida, who has directed other popular works like Cobra Kai, On My Block, Grown-ish, Haters Back Off, and Crazy Ex-Girlfriend. It was produced by Maggie Malina, Jeremy Kipp Walker, and Alicia Keys. Filming took place on the island of Mauritius in late 2020. Viewers can stay at the same resort where the movie was filmed, the Constance Prince Maurice.

Reception
On review aggregator Rotten Tomatoes, 59% of 17 reviews are positive, with an average rating of 5.80/10. On Metacritic it has a weighted average score of 46 out of 100, based on reviews from 5 critics, indicating "mixed or average reviews".
	
Lisa Kennedy of Variety wrote: "To say that Resort to Love is slight would be akin to snatching a romance novel out of your closest friend's hands while she sits reading and sipping a margarita on a beach. Why would you do that? It's summer. Leave the girl her pleasures."

References

External links
 
 

2021 films
2021 directorial debut films
2021 romantic comedy films
2020s American films
2020s English-language films
American romantic comedy films
English-language Netflix original films
Films about singers
Films directed by Steven Tsuchida
Films set in resorts
Films shot in Mauritius